Elachista dasycara is a moth of the family Elachistidae. It is in North America, including Colorado, Alberta and Saskatchewan.

The forewings are white, with a few pale ocherous scales forming a faint spot at the middle of the fold. A second spot is located at the end of the fold, and a smaller spot at the end of the cell. The apex of the wing is tinged with ocherous. The hindwings are shining white.

References

dasycara
Moths described in 1999
Moths of North America